The 2007 DFL-Ligapokal Final decided the winner of the 2007 DFL-Ligapokal, the 11th and final edition of the reiterated DFL-Ligapokal, a knockout football cup competition.

The match was played on 28 July 2007 at the Zentralstadion in Leipzig. Bayern Munich won the match 1–0 against Schalke 04 for their 6th title.

Teams
In the following table, finals until 2004 were in the DFB-Ligapokal era, since 2005 were in the DFL-Ligapokal era.

Route to the final
The DFL-Ligapokal was a six team single-elimination knockout cup competition. There were a total of two rounds leading up to the final. Four teams entered the preliminary round, with the two winners advancing to the semi-finals, where they were joined by two additional clubs who were given a bye. For all matches, the winner after 90 minutes advanced. If still tied, extra time, and if necessary a penalty shoot-out were used to determine the winner.

Match

Details

References

2007
FC Bayern Munich matches
FC Schalke 04 matches
2007–08 in German football cups